John Johnston  (October 13, 1881 – September 12, 1950) was a Scottish born chemist.

A native of Perth, Scotland, Johnston was born on October 13, 1881. He earned a bachelor's of science degree in 1903 and a doctor of science in 1908. From 1903 to 1905, Johnston's studies at St. Andrews University were funded by the Carnegie Scholarship. He began working at the Massachusetts Institute of Technology in 1907, leaving the next year for a position at the Geophysical Laboratory at the Carnegie Institution for Science. In 1916, Johnston became head of research for the American Zinc, Lead and Smelting Company, subsequently moving to the U.S. Bureau of Mines in 1917, and the National Research Council in 1918. He taught at Yale University starting in 1919. From 1920, Johnston served as the school's first Sterling Professor. He resigned the position in 1927, returning to industry as head of research for the U.S. Steel Corporation. Johnston retired from U.S. Steel in 1946. He was a member of several scientific societies, serving on the editorial board of the American Chemical Society  from 1914 to 1923, and as councilor in 1936. Johnston also led the Electrochemical Society as president between 1934 and 1935.

References

Alumni of the University of St Andrews
1950 deaths
20th-century Scottish scientists
Scottish chemists
Scottish expatriates in the United States
People from Perth, Scotland
Yale University faculty
Yale Sterling Professors
1881 births
Presidents of the Electrochemical Society